Baghi Sipahi (Hindi: बागी सिपाही, Urdu: باغی سپاہی, meaning Rebel Soldier) may refer to the following films: 
 Baghi Sipahi, a 1936 Indian Hindi/Urdu film 
 Baghi Sipahi, a 1958 Indian film 
 Baghi Sipahi, a 1986 Pakistani film

See also
 Baghi (disambiguation)